Dwight Edward Clark (January 8, 1957 – June 4, 2018) was an American professional football player who was a wide receiver for nine seasons with the San Francisco 49ers of the National Football League (NFL) from 1979   He was a member of San Francisco's first two Super Bowl championship teams.

He caught the winning touchdown pass thrown by quarterback Joe Montana in the NFC Championship Game on January 10th, 1982 against the Dallas Cowboys. The play, immortalized as "The Catch", propelled the 49ers to their first Super Bowl championship. Clark played college football at Clemson University and was selected by the 49ers in the tenth round of the 1979 NFL Draft. He served as the general manager of the 49ers from 1995 to 1998 and in the same capacity with the Cleveland Browns from 1999 to 2001.

Early years
Born on January 8, 1957, in Kinston, North Carolina, Clark graduated from Garinger High School in Charlotte, where he played quarterback. Clark talked about how he was nervous playing quarterback in high school. At , his first love was basketball, but he accepted a scholarship to play college football at Clemson University.

As a freshman, he was moved to wide receiver, because the team had recruited four other quarterbacks. As a sophomore, he was named the starter at strong safety, but he disliked the position and left school to go back to his hometown in Charlotte instead. He was unhappy and considered transferring to play basketball at Appalachian State University, until he was finally allowed to play offense. After returning to the team, he was a backup wide receiver and finished with five receptions for 99 yards and a 19.8-yard average.

As a junior, he was named a starter at wide receiver and was part of the team that qualified Clemson to the Gator Bowl, its first bowl game in 18 years. He was third on the team with 17 receptions for 265 yards and one touchdown.

In his senior season in 1978, the Tigers were  won the Gator Bowl over Ohio State, and finished sixth in the final AP poll. He was second on the team with 11 receptions for 207 yards and 2 touchdowns, including a career-high 68-yard touchdown catch against the University of Maryland that helped the Tigers win the ACC Championship.

At Clemson, he wore #30, posting only 33 catches for 571 yards, 3 touchdowns and a 17.3-yard average (seventh in school history). Unheralded as a collegian playing alongside wide receiver Jerry Butler, Clark felt fortunate to get to 

In 1988, he was inducted into the Clemson Hall of Fame. In 2018, he was inducted into the South Carolina Football Hall of Fame.

Professional career
The San Francisco 49ers selected Clark with the first pick of the tenth round (249th overall) of the 1979 NFL Draft, even though some people in the organization questioned the selection at the time, considering he was seen as an undrafted free agent. New head coach Bill Walsh had visited Clemson to scout quarterback Steve Fuller, Clark's roommate. When the 49er contingent arrived on campus, Clark answered the phone by chance on his way out to play golf and was convinced to participate as Fuller's pass catcher at the workout, where Walsh was impressed with his 

But they soon greatly improved, winning the Super Bowl at the ends of the 1981 and 1984 seasons, and, starting in 1981, making the playoffs every year Clark was with them except 1982.

Clark tallied 506 catches for 6,750 yards and 48 touchdowns, along with 50 rushing yards in his nine NFL seasons with the 49ers. He led the NFL in receptions (60) during the strike-shortened 1982 season and made the Pro Bowl twice, in 1981 and 1982. Sports Illustrated writer Paul Zimmerman named Clark his Player of the Year for 1982.

The Catch

In the 1981 NFC Championship game, on January 10, 1982, against the Dallas Cowboys, the 49ers trailed  with 58 seconds to play. On 3rd-and-3, Clark leaped and caught a 6-yard pass from quarterback Joe Montana in the back of the end zone to tie the score, and Ray Wersching's extra-point kick advanced the 49ers to Super Bowl XVI. That play, one of the most famous in the history of the NFL, has been immortalized as "The Catch". Clark finished the game with eight receptions for 120 yards and two touchdowns. During the 1981 season, Walsh had Montana practice that part of the play back in training camp. Montana said, "We'd never thrown the ball to Dwight on that play, at all." In the early 1990s, Clark's catch had become the most requested clip in the archives of NFL Films, which was charging up to $5,000 for its use.

Retirement and legacy
After nine seasons with the 49ers, Clark retired following the 1987 season. He was a member of two Super Bowl-winning teams (XVI and XIX). To honor his contribution to 49ers, the club retired his #87 in 1988. He served as a team executive for the 49ers until 1998, when he resigned to become the first General Manager in the expansion era of the Cleveland Browns, after following Carmen Policy who would run the team under the ownership of Al Lerner. He was Executive Vice President and Director of Football Operations from  On May 14, 2002, he resigned from his position with the Browns after new head coach Butch Davis requested the right to make personnel decisions. In the 2018 NFL Films documentary Dwight Clark: A Football Life, he was quoted as saying that it was probably a mistake to have accepted the position. He would later return to North Carolina to run his real estate business.

Clark built his restaurant, Clark's By The Bay, the year he retired and decorated it with sports memorabilia including The Catch. Initially serving Cajun food, it later switched to prime rib and seafood. Located in Redwood City, California, the restaurant was sold in 1993.

Clark was the lead role in the 1993 direct-to-video comedy Kindergarten Ninja. He also appeared in the video game All-Pro Football 2K8. He joined Comcast SportsNet Bay Area in 2011 as an analyst for 49ers Postgame Live. Post-retirement, Clark expressed remorse about the end of Candlestick Park, saying that "It was a dump [but] it was our dump, so we could talk bad about it, but we didn't want anybody else to talk bad about it."

NFL career statistics

Personal life
Clark dated Miss Universe Shawn Weatherly from 1978 to 1982. He later married Ashley Stone, whom he met during the summer of 1982. He had three children with Stone: a daughter, Casey, and two sons, Riley and Mac.

Clark married Kelly Radzikowski in 2011. They moved to Santa Cruz.

Illness and death

On March 19, 2017, Clark announced that he had been diagnosed with amyotrophic lateral sclerosis (ALS), also known as Lou Gehrig's disease. He stated that he believed he developed ALS as a result of playing football; he suffered three concussions during his playing career. "I've been asked if playing football caused this," Clark wrote. "I don't know for sure. But I certainly suspect it did. And I encourage the National Football League Players Association (NFLPA) and the NFL to continue working together in their efforts to make the game of football safer, especially as it relates to head trauma."

Clark died of the disease on June 4, 2018. At the time of his death, Clark lived in Whitefish, Montana, with his wife Kelly. He was the father-in-law of former NHL defenseman Peter Harrold. Clark had a close friendship with former 49ers owner Edward J. DeBartolo Jr. DeBartolo sent Clark to Japan in 2017 to bring back a three-month supply of the drug Radicava before it became available in the United States.

References

External links

 
 

1957 births
2018 deaths
American football wide receivers
Clemson Tigers football players
Cleveland Browns executives
Deaths from motor neuron disease
National Conference Pro Bowl players
National Football League general managers
National Football League players with retired numbers
Neurological disease deaths in Montana
Players of American football from Charlotte, North Carolina
San Francisco 49ers executives
San Francisco 49ers players
Sportspeople from Charlotte, North Carolina